Renato Dintinosante (born 24 May 1963) is a former Australian rules footballer who played for Richmond in the Victorian Football League (VFL) in 1987. Originally from Preston, Victoria, he played for the Fitzroy reserves, before moving to Western Australia to play for the Claremont Football Club in the West Australian Football League (WAFL).  He was then recruited by Richmond in 1987 where he played in the final two games of the season.

References

External links

Living people
1963 births
Richmond Football Club players
Claremont Football Club players
Australian rules footballers from Melbourne
People from Preston, Victoria